The following table shows progression of the world record in the men's hammer throw, as recognised by the International Association of Athletics Federations (IAAF). The first world record in the event was recognised by the IAAF in 1913. As of June 21, 2009, 45 world records have been ratified by the IAAF in the event.

World record progression

Unratified marks

Notes
Many sources do not give the date of Theimer's world record. It occurred in the qualifying round of the East German Championships at Erfurt (not Leipzig), which ran from the July 3–6, 1974. His record came with his very first throw, his series being (76.60 m 73.62 m 73.28 m), which was on day two of the championships, July 4, 1974. Next day, in the championship itself, he threw 73.62 m (241 ft. 6") for first place.

References

Hammer 
Hammer, men
World record